The 2018 NRL season was the 111th season of professional rugby league in Australia and the 21st season run by the National Rugby League. The main competition, known as the 2018 Telstra Premiership due to sponsorship from Telstra, featured 16 teams playing 25 weekly rounds of matches from March until September, resulting in the top eight teams playing a series of finals matches to determine which two teams reached the 2018 NRL Grand Final.

Teams

The lineup of teams remained unchanged for the 12th consecutive year.

Pre-season

The 2018 pre-season featured the 2018 World Club Challenge match with the NRL premiers Melbourne Storm defeating the Super League champions Leeds Rhinos.

Regular season

With the City vs. Country representative game having been scrapped, the NRL scheduled 6 games to take place in regional areas of New South Wales and Queensland as a replacement: Tamworth, Bathurst & Mudgee, and Toowoomba, Gladstone & Cairns.

The overall structure of the season's draw was also revised. The second game of the 2018 State of Origin series was played as a stand-alone fixture on a Sunday to avoid conflict with the regular season. Due to this the competition was shortened to 25 rounds and each team got 1 bye as opposed to 2 in previous years.

Bold – Opposition's Home game
X – Bye
* – Golden point game
Opponent for round listed above margin

Ladder

Ladder progression

Numbers highlighted in green indicate that the team finished the round inside the top 8.
Numbers highlighted in blue indicates the team finished first on the ladder in that round.
Numbers highlighted in red indicates the team finished last place on the ladder in that round.
Underlined numbers indicate that the team had a bye during that round.

Finals series

† Match decided in extra time.

Chart

Grand final

Player statistics and records
 Jamayne Isaako broke the record for the most points scored in a rookie season with 239, which was set by Mick Cronin in 1977 who scored 225 points.
 Gavin Cooper became the first forward in the 111 year history of the NRL to score a try in nine consecutive games, beating the previous record of eight set by Frank Burge in 1918.
 Cameron Smith became the first hooker in NRL history to score 200 points in a season.

The following statistics are as of the conclusion of Round 25.

Top 5 point scorers

Top 5 try scorers

Top 5 goal scorers

Top 5 tacklers

2018 Transfers

Players

Source:

Coaches

References